The Lion's Den is a 1936 American western film directed by Sam Newfield and starring Tim McCoy, Joan Woodbury and Don Barclay.

Main cast
 Tim McCoy as Tim Barton 
 Joan Woodbury as Ann Mervin 
 Don Barclay as Paddy Callahan 
 J. Frank Glendon as Nate Welsh 
 John Merton as Single-Shot Smith 
 Arthur Millett as Newt Mervin 
 Jack Rockwell as Texas Ranger 
 Dick Curtis as Slim Burtis - Henchman

References

Bibliography
 Pitts, Michael R. Western Movies: A Guide to 5,105 Feature Films. McFarland, 2012.

External links

1936 films
1936 Western (genre) films
American Western (genre) films
1930s English-language films
Films directed by Sam Newfield
1930s American films